Lucía Pardo Méndez (born 5 January 2000) is a Spanish footballer who plays as a forward for Madrid CFF.

Club career
Pardo started her career at Milagrosa.

References

External links
Profile at La Liga

2000 births
Living people
Women's association football forwards
Spanish women's footballers
People from Lugo (comarca)
Sportspeople from the Province of Lugo
Footballers from Galicia (Spain)
Madrid CFF players
Primera División (women) players
Segunda Federación (women) players